Ana Dayarí Santos Balbuena (born 12 February 2000), known as Dayarí Balbuena, is a Dominican futsal player who plays as a pivot and a footballer who plays as a centre forward for Cibao FC and the Dominican Republic women's national team.

International career
Balbuena represented the Dominican Republic at the 2018 Summer Youth Olympics. At senior level, she played the 2020 CONCACAF Women's Olympic Qualifying Championship qualification.

International goals
Scores and results list Dominican Republic's goal tally first.

References

External links

2000 births
Living people
Women's association football forwards
Dominican Republic women's footballers
People from Santa Cruz de Mao
Dominican Republic women's international footballers
Cibao FC players
Dominican Republic women's futsal players
Futsal players at the 2018 Summer Youth Olympics